Estadio Carlos Dittborn (Carlos Dittborn Stadium) is a multi-purpose stadium in Arica, Chile.  It is currently used mostly for football matches.  The stadium currently holds 9,746 people and was built in 1962 as a venue for the 1962 World Cup, which was hosted by Chile.  It was named in honor of Carlos Dittborn, the president of the Chilean Organization Committee for the World Cup, who died one month prior to the start of the 1962 World Cup. It is the home stadium of San Marcos de Arica.

The stadium held the matches of Group 1 (consisting of Soviet Union, Yugoslavia, Uruguay, Colombia), as well as the second round match between Chile and Soviet Union. It witnessed the only Olympic goal (scored directly from a corner kick) in world cup history (as of 2018), scored by Colombian Marcos Coll against Russian goalkeeper Lev Yashin.

References

Carlos Dittborn
Carlos Dittborn
Buildings and structures in Arica y Parinacota Region
Multi-purpose stadiums in Chile
Sport in Arica y Parinacota Region
Buildings and structures in Arica
Sports venues completed in 1962